Babu Bogati is a pop singer and actor from Nepal. He has also played in several television shows. He started off his career as a singer. He featured his first song called Maya Ko Aauti Chino. After that he started singing and then acting. In 2010 his first film released called Bato Muniko Phul and he began his career as an actor. On May 19, 2016, Bogati also participated in Melancholy, an environmental song by 365 Nepali singers and musicians, is conceptualized by Environmentalist Nipesh DHAKA which song broke Guinness World Records in entitled "Most Vocal Solos in a Song Recording".

Filmography

References

20th-century Nepalese male singers
21st-century Nepalese male actors
Nepalese male television actors
Nepalese male film actors
1982 births
Living people
People from Bhojpur District, Nepal
Nepalese playback singers
Khas people